Lakshmanrekha is a 1991 Indian Hindi-language film directed by Sunil Sikand & produced by Pran. The film stars Naseeruddin Shah, Jackie Shroff, Sangeeta Bijlani, Shilpa Shirodkar in pivotal roles. Laxmikant-Pyarelal composed the music for the film.

Cast
 Naseeruddin Shah as Amar Sharma
 Jackie Shroff as Vikram Sharma "Vicky"
 Sangeeta Bijlani as Beenu
 Shilpa Shirodkar as Vaishali
 Shammi Kapoor as Baba Sahib
 Raza Murad as DCP Pandey
 Danny Denzongpa as Birju
 Pran as Kishanlal Sharma
 Om Prakash as Gafoor Bhai

Plot
Amar Sharma (Naseeruddin Shah) and Vicky (Jackie Shroff) are two close friends. Amar is a police inspector, but Vicky is a career criminal, who has no respect for the law. But fate has a bitter twist for Amar, when his dad, Kishanlal Sharma (Pran) is killed right in front of his eyes by Birju (Danny Denzongpa) and he is unable to convict and imprison Birju, due to false alibis. Amar attempts to avenge his dad's death by attempting to kill Birju on his yacht, but is severely beaten, tossed overboard, and left for dead. He survives and returns to finish his job, only to be confronted by Vicky, who is now a police inspector, and will not permit Amar to take the law in his own hands.

Songs
The songs are written by Anand Bakshi and composed by Laxmikant–Pyarelal.

External links

Films scored by Laxmikant–Pyarelal
1990s Hindi-language films
1991 films
1991 drama films
Indian drama films